Le Pennec is a surname created from Breton Penneg (stubborn). Notable people with the surname include:

 Émilie Le Pennec (born 1987), French artistic gymnast
 Yann Le Pennec (born 1974), French slalom canoeist

Breton-language surnames